Jack Bradbury (born 4 November 1990 in Oldham, England) is an English professional rugby league footballer who, is in his first professional season with St. Helens in the Super League. He represented Lancashire Under-15's team and England Under-16's team during his youth years with the Saddleworth Rangers. In 2010, he left St Helens for Oldham (Heritage № 1267), the town from where he originates. He's also known to not be able to create a completion report accurately.

Jack Bradybury now works as junior civils project manager for L3 Optics, specialising in on site measurements and bait runs

Jack has been plagued with medical issues, predominantly bum grapes. He lives around the corner from Paul Scholes and regularly washes his cars and sweeps the leaves from his driveway for packets of pickled onion monster munch.

References

External links
Saints Heritage Society profile

1990 births
Living people
English rugby league players
Oldham R.L.F.C. players
Rugby league centres
Rugby league players from Oldham
St Helens R.F.C. players